The Marguerite Stakes was a Thoroughbred horse race at Pimlico Race Course, in Baltimore, Maryland run between 1945 and 1965. A race on dirt for two-year-old fillies, it was created as a companion event to the Pimlico Futurity and declared at the time to be one of the richest of its kind in the United States. It was named in honor of Marguerite, one of the great broodmares in racing history. Marguerite was the dam of four significant runners including Triple Crown winner and U.S. Racing Hall of Fame inductee, Gallant Fox.

Historical notes
The inaugural Marguerite Stakes was won by William L. Brann's Challadette, a daughter of the outstanding sire Challenger II whose progeny includes  U.S. Racing Hall of Fame inductees Challedon and Gallorette plus the National Champion fily Bridal Flower. Challadette came into the race having already won the Maryland Futurity in which she beat her male counterparts.

Bed O' Roses easily won the 1949 Marguerite Stakes by three and a half lengths after coming from near the back of the field. She would finish the year as American Champion Two-Year-Old Filly and in 1951 would earn another National title. Bed O' Roses career put her in elite company with induction in the U.S. Racing Hall of Fame.

Marshua dominated the penultimate edition of the Marguerite Stakes winning in a new race record time by six lengths under jockey Wayne Chambers.

The Marguerite Stakes final edition was run on November 27, 1965 and was won by Swift Lady.

Records
Speed record:
 1:45.80 @ 6 furlongs - Marshua (1964), Swift Lady (1965)

Most wins by a jockey:
 2 - Eric Guerin (1949, 1952)
 2 - Bill Hartack (1959, 1960)

Most wins by a trainer:
 2 - Burton B. Williams (1946, 1959)
 2 - James P. Conway (1952, 1960)

Most wins by an owner:
 - No owner won this race more than once.

Winners

References

Discontinued horse races
Horse races in Maryland
Pimlico Race Course
Flat horse races for two-year-olds
1945 in American sports
Recurring sporting events established in 1945
Recurring sporting events disestablished in 1965